Romeo and Juliet (Spanish:Julieta y Romeo) is a 1940 Spanish historical drama film directed by José María Castellví and starring Martha Flores and Enrique Guitart. The film is an adaptation of William Shakespeare's Romeo and Juliet.

Plot summary

Cast
 Juan Barajas 
 Arturo Cámara 
 Marta Flores 
 Marta Grau 
 Enrique Guitart 
 Francisco Hernández 
 María Teresa Idel 
 Teresa Idel 
 Candelaria Medina

References

Bibliography
 Davies, Anthony & Wells, Stanley. Shakespeare and the Moving Image: The Plays on Film and Television. Cambridge University Press, 1994.

External links 
 

1940 films
Spanish historical drama films
1940s historical drama films
1940s Spanish-language films
Films based on Romeo and Juliet
Films directed by José María Castellví
Spanish black-and-white films
1940s Spanish films